The 2020 Iași Open was a professional tennis tournament played on clay courts. It was the first edition of the tournament which was part of the 2020 ATP Challenger Tour. It took place in Iași, Romania between 14 and 20 September 2020.

Singles main-draw entrants

Seeds

 1 Rankings as of 31 August 2020.

Other entrants
The following players received wildcards into the singles main draw:
  Cezar Crețu
  Nicholas David Ionel
  Filip Cristian Jianu

The following player received entry into the singles main draw using a protected ranking:
  Arthur De Greef

The following players received entry into the singles main draw as special exempts:
  Pablo Andújar
  Marc-Andrea Hüsler

The following players received entry from the qualifying draw:
  Tomás Martín Etcheverry
  Matteo Martineau
  Felipe Meligeni Alves
  Kacper Żuk

Champions

Singles

 Carlos Taberner def.  Mathias Bourgue 6–4, 7–6(7–4).

Doubles

 Rafael Matos /  João Menezes def.  Treat Huey /  Nathaniel Lammons 6–2, 6–2.

References

2020 ATP Challenger Tour
September 2020 sports events in Europe
September 2020 sports events in Romania
2020 in Romanian tennis